Kelso Lake is a lake in Cook County, Minnesota. It is within the Boundary Waters Canoe Area Wilderness and the Superior National Forest. Kelso Lake is a very long and narrow lake. It lies west of Sawbill Lake.

Recreation 
There are three designated campsites on the lakeshore. Two campsites are on the north end of the lake, one is on the south end near the  portage south to Alton Lake.

Fish species 
Fish species in Kelso Lake include bluegill, northern pike, smallmouth bass, yellow perch, and white sucker.

References 

Lakes of Cook County, Minnesota
Lakes of Minnesota